Omophoita is a genus of flea beetles in the family Chrysomelidae. There are some 50 described species in North America and the Neotropics.

Selected species

 Omophoita aequinoctialis (Linnaeus, 1758)
 Omophoita albicollis (Fabricius, 1787)
 Omophoita blakeae Bechyné, 1958
 Omophoita clerica (Erichson, 1848)
 Omophoita cyanipennis (Fabricius, 1798) (eight-spotted flea beetle)
 Omophoita episcopalis
 Omophoita ernesta Bechyne
 Omophoita fulgida (Olivier, 1807)
 Omophoita ophthalmicus
 Omophoita osunai
 Omophoita peruviana
 Omophoita quadrinotata (Fabricius, 1798)
 Omophoita stenodera Bechyné, 1958
 Omophoita succincta

References

Further reading

External links

 

Alticini
Chrysomelidae genera
Articles created by Qbugbot
Taxa named by Louis Alexandre Auguste Chevrolat